is an interchange passenger railway station in the city of Matsudo, Chiba, Japan, operated by East Japan Railway Company (JR East) and the private railway operator Ryūtetsu.

Lines
It is also forms the terminus of the 5.7 kilometer Ryūtetsu Nagareyama Line.

Station layout
The station consists of two island platforms, one each for the Jōban Line and the Nagareyama Line. The station is staffed.

Platforms

JR

Nagareyama Line

History
Mabashi Station opened on August 6, 1898 as a station on the Nippon Railway Tsuchiura Line. It was nationalised on November 1, 1906, becoming part of the Japanese Government Railways (JGR) and the line name changed on October 12, 1909 to the Jōban Line. The privately owned Nagareyama Line began operations from Mabashi Station from March 14, 1916. Freight services from this station ceased on April 20, 1971, when the Jōban line was quadrupled. The station was absorbed into the JR East network upon the privatization of JNR on April 1, 1987.

Passenger statistics
In fiscal 2019, the JR portion of the station was used by an average of 25,675 passengers daily. In fiscal 2018, the Ryutetsu portion of the station was used by an average of 1525 passengers daily.

See also
 List of railway stations in Japan

References

External links

 JR East Station information 
 Ryutetsu station information 

Railway stations in Japan opened in 1898
Railway stations in Chiba Prefecture
Jōban Line
Matsudo